Syed Suhail Pasha (born 26 September 1999) is an Indian professional footballer who plays as a forward for I-League club TRAU.

Career
He made his professional debut for the Chennai City F.C. against Aizawl F.C. on 17 December 2019, He was brought in the 59th minute as Chennai City drew 1–1.

Personal life 
Syed Suhail Pasha is the son of Chennaiyin FC's interim head coach Syed Sabir Pasha. He belongs to Chennai, Tamil Nadu. He said in an interview that Lallianzuala Chhangte was his favourite Chennayin FC player. Suhail is a fan of FC Barcelona.

Career statistics

Club

References

1999 births
Living people
Indian footballers
Chennai City FC players
Footballers from Chennai
I-League players
Association football midfielders
Chennaiyin FC B players
I-League 2nd Division players